Riding for Fame is a lost 1928 American silent Western film directed by B. Reeves Eason and starring Hoot Gibson. It was produced and distributed by Universal Pictures.

Cast
 Hoot Gibson as Scratch 'Em Hank Scott
 Ethlyne Clair as Kitty Barton
 Charles K. French as Dad Barton
 Slim Summerville as High-Pockets (as George Summerville)
 Allan Forrest as Donald Morgan
 Ruth Cherrington as Miss Hemingway
 Chet Ryan 
 Bob Burns (as Robert Burns)

References

External links
 
 

1928 films
Lost American films
Universal Pictures films
Films directed by B. Reeves Eason
1928 Western (genre) films
Lost Western (genre) films
1928 lost films
Silent American Western (genre) films
1920s American films